General Gómez may refer to:

Félix Uresti Gómez (1887—1916), Mexican revolutionary forces general
José Domingo Molina Gómez (1896–1969), Argentine Army general
Juan Vicente Gómez (1857–1935), Venezuelan Army general
Leandro Gómez (1811–1865), Uruguayan Army general
Máximo Gómez (1836–1905), Dominican-born major general in Cuba's Ten Years' War with Spain

See also
John Gomes (officer) (fl. 1970s–2010s), Bangladesh Army major general